Shane Day is an American football coach who is the senior offensive assistant for the Houston Texans of the National Football League (NFL). He previously served as an assistant coach for the Los Angeles Chargers, San Francisco 49ers, Miami Dolphins, Washington Redskins and the Chicago Bears. Day has also served as an assistant coach for Connecticut and Michigan.

Early years
Day was a two sport athlete at Rhodes College, playing both football and baseball.  He graduated from Kansas State University in 1999 with a degree in English.

Coaching career

Auburn Riverside High School
In 2001, Day began his coaching career as the wide receivers coach at Auburn Riverside High School. He then spent the next three years as the quarterbacks coach for the high school, as well as taking on the role of offensive coordinator during the final two years.

University of Michigan
In 2006, Day was hired as an offensive quality control coach at the University of Michigan, where he worked with future NFL quarterback Chad Henne.

San Francisco 49ers
In 2007, Day was hired by the San Francisco 49ers as an offensive quality control coach. He held the position for three years, two years under offensive coordinator Mike Martz, who later hired Day to work for him in Chicago. Day oversaw the quarterbacks in 2007, running backs in 2008, and the offensive line in 2009. He was also part of the staff that coached the South team during the 2008 Senior Bowl.

Chicago Bears
On February 5, 2010, Day was hired by the Chicago Bears as their quarterbacks coach. He was recommended for the job by Chicago's offensive coordinator Mike Martz, with whom Day had worked with for two seasons in San Francisco. Day helped the Bears reach the NFC Championship game in 2010.

University of Connecticut
On January 24, 2012, Day was hired as the quarterbacks coach at the University of Connecticut, replacing Joe Moorhead, who had left for the head coach position at Fordham University. Day called plays for the Husky offense the final 3 games of 2013 in which the offense took off, setting several school records, and leading to 3 consecutive wins against Temple, Rutgers, and Memphis.

Washington Redskins
On January 23, 2014, Day was hired by the Washington Redskins as their assistant offensive line coach.

Miami Dolphins
On January 12, 2016, Day was hired by the Miami Dolphins as their tight ends coach.

San Francisco 49ers (second stint)
In 2019, Day returned to the San Francisco 49ers after he was hired as their quarterbacks coach under head coach Kyle Shanahan.

Los Angeles Chargers
On January 28, 2021, Day was hired to be the Los Angeles Chargers quarterbacks coach. On the heels of a Chargers loss in their AFC Wild Card game against the Jacksonville Jaguars where they blew a 27point lead, he and offensive coordinator Joe Lombardi were both fired on January 17, 2023.

Houston Texans
On February 19, 2023, Day was hired to be the Houston Texans Senior offensive assistant.

Personal life
Day is married to his wife, Christie. They have one daughter, Vivienne, 1 horse named TT, 3 dogs, and 1 cat.

References

1974 births
Living people
Sportspeople from Manhattan, Kansas
Players of American football from Kansas
American football wide receivers
Rhodes Lynx football players
Kansas State University alumni
High school football coaches in Washington (state)
Michigan Wolverines football coaches
San Francisco 49ers coaches
Chicago Bears coaches
UConn Huskies football coaches
Washington Redskins coaches
Miami Dolphins coaches
Los Angeles Chargers coaches